Zdeněk Kolář (born 9 October 1996) is a Czech tennis player.

Kolář has a career high ATP singles ranking of World No. 111 achieved on 13 June 2022. He also has a career high doubles ranking of World No. 110 achieved on 1 August 2022.

Professional career

2018: ATP debut
Kolář played his first match in an ATP tournament, after qualifying for the 2018 Swedish Open. He was defeated in straight sets by defending champion and former Top 10 member David Ferrer.

2021: Three Challenger titles
In 2021, Kolář won 3 ATP Challenger singles titles: in April in Oeiras Portugal, in August in Iasi Romania, in September in Szczecin Poland and 4 ATP Challenger doubles titles.

2022: Grand Slam debut and first ATP & Major win
In 2022, Kolář made his ATP main draw debut in doubles at Chile Open alongside Nikola Milojević. They reached the quarterfinals with a win over local wildcards Alejandro Tabilo and Gonzalo Lama.

In his fifth qualifying attempt, Kolar finally reached the main draw of the 2022 French Open with a straight sets win over Franco Agamenone for his Grand Slam main draw debut. He won his first ATP and Grand Slam match defeating home favorite and wildcard Lucas Pouille. He lost in the second round to 4th seed Stefanos Tsitsipas in four sets with three tiebreaks in a match that lasted over 4 hours.

He entered the 2022 Wimbledon Championships main draw as a lucky loser.

National representation
Kolář was nominated for the Czech Republic Davis Cup team in 2017 but did not play in a match.

Grand Slam singles performance timeline

Challenger and Futures finals

Singles: 18 (7 titles, 11 runner-ups)

Doubles: 40 (22 titles, 18 runner-ups)

Notes

References

External links
 
 

1996 births
Living people
People from Bystřice nad Pernštejnem
Czech male tennis players
Sportspeople from the Vysočina Region
21st-century Czech people